Ana Paula Zacarias (born 5 January 1959 in Lisbon, Portugal) is a Portuguese diplomat and the Secretary of State for European Affairs of the XXII Constitutional Government of Portugal. She was Head of the European Union's delegation to Brazil from 2011 to 2015.

Biography 

Ana Paula completed her degree in Cultural Anthropology in 1983 at the New University of Lisbon (NOVA). From 1984 to 2011, she held various positions with the Portuguese Ministry of Foreign Affairs. During this time, she worked as Vice President of the Camões Institute in Lisbon (2000), Deputy Permanent Representative of Portugal to UNESCO in Paris (2005), and Ambassador of Portugal to Estonia in Tallinn (2008) before becoming Deputy Permanent Representative of Portugal to the European Union in Brussels until 2011.

On 8 March 2011, she was appointed as the European Union's Head of Delegation to Brazil. In July 2015, she was replaced by João Gomes Cravinho.

In July 2017, she was appointed Secretary of State for European Affairs in the XXI Constitutional Government of Portugal.

References

External links 
 XXI Government - Portuguese Republic
Delegation of the European Union to Brazil

People from Lisbon
Portuguese diplomats
Living people
1959 births